Justice Schneider may refer to:

Louis J. Schneider Jr., associate justice of the Ohio Supreme Court
Michael H. Schneider Sr., associate justice of the Supreme Court of Texas